This is a list of cruisers, from 1860 to the present. It includes torpedo, unprotected, protected, scout, light, armoured, battle-, heavy and missile cruisers.  Dates are launching dates.

Africa

South Africa

 Protected cruiser

 SATS General Botha (1885, ex-HMS Thames) - Assigned 1922, scuttled 1947.

Americas

Argentina

 Torpedo cruiser
  (1893) - Decommissioned 1927
 Protected cruisers
  (1886) - Decommissioned 1927
 Necochea (1890) - Renamed Veinticinco de Mayo, decommissioned 1921
  (1892) - Discarded 1930
  (1895) - Retired 1932
 Armored cruisers
 
  (1895) - Retired 1934
  (1896) - Retired 1935
  (1897) - Retired 1947
  (1897) - Retired 1954
 Bernardino Rivadavia (1902) - Sold to Japan before delivery 1904, renamed Kasuga, discarded 1945 
 Mariano Moreno (1903) - Sold to Japan before delivery 1904, renamed Nisshin, retired 1935
 Heavy cruisers
 
  (1929) - Scrapped 1960
  (1929) - Scrapped 1962
 Light cruisers
   (1937) - Retired 1972
 
  (1936, ex-USS Boise) - Assigned 1951, retired 1977
  (1938, ex-USS Phoenix) - Assigned 1951, sunk 1982 in the Falklands War

Brazil

 Auxiliary cruisers (former merchant ships)
 Niterói (1893) - Ex El Cid, purchased 1893, sold to United States 1898 and renamed USS Buffalo
 Torpedo cruisers
 Tymbira (1896) - ?
 Tamoio (1896) - ?
 Tupi (1896) - Retired 1915
 Protected cruisers
  (1890) - Retired 1915
 Tiradentes (1892) - Decommissioned 1919 
 Republica (1892) - Retired 1921
 
 Name unknown (1896) - Not acquired, purchased by Chile and renamed Ministro Zenteno, decommissioned 1930
  - Retired 1931
 Amazonas (1896) - Not acquired, purchased by United States and renamed USS New Orleans, decommissioned 1922
 Almirante Abreu (1899) - Not acquired, purchased by United States and renamed USS Albany, decommissioned 1922
 Scout cruisers
 
  (1909) - Lost 1945
  (1910) - BU 1948
 Light cruisers
 
 Almirante Barroso (1936, ex-USS Philadelphia) - Assigned 1951, retired 1973 
 
 Almirante Tamandaré (1938, ex-USS St. Louis) - Assigned 1951, retired 1976

Canada
Protected cruiser
 British 
  (1891, ex-British Rainbow, transferred 1910) – Sold 1920
 British 
  (1897, ex-British Niobe, transferred 1910) – BU 1922
Light cruisers
 British 
  (1913, ex-British Aurora, transferred 1920) – Sold for scrap 1927
 British 
  (1941, ex-British Uganda, transferred 1944) – Renamed Quebec 1952, BU 1961
 British 
  (1943, ex-British Minotaur, transferred 1944) – BU 1960

Chile

 Unprotected cruiser   
 Arturo Prat (1880) - Purchase canceled and sold to Japan in 1883, renamed , retired 1910
 Protected cruisers
  (1883) - Sold to Japan 1894, renamed , discarded 1912
 
 Presidente Errázuriz (1890) - Discarded 1930
 Presidente Pinto (1890) - Shipwreck 1905
 Blanco Encalada (1893) - Retired 1940
 Ministro Zenteno (1896) - Retired 1930
 Chacabuco (1897) - Stricken 1959
 Armored cruisers
 Esmeralda (1895) - Retired 1930
 O'Higgins (1896) - Retired 1933
 Light cruisers
 
 OHiggins (1936, ex-USS Brooklyn)  - Acquired 1951, retired 1991
 Capitán Prat (1937, ex-USS Nashville)  - Acquired 1951, retired 1982
 
 Almirante Latorre (1945, ex-Swedish Göta Lejon)  - Commissioned 1971, retired 1984

Haiti
 Protected cruiser

 Consul Gostrück (1894-ex Italian Umbria), assigned 1910, lost 1911.

Peru

Auxiliary cruisers (former merchant ships)
 Sócrates class (ex-Portuguese)
 Sócrates (1880) - Renamed Lima, assigned 1889, retired 1950
 Diógenes (1881) - Renamed Callao, not delivered, purchased by the United States in 1898 and renamed USS Topeka
Scout cruisers
  Almirante Grau (1906) - retired 1958
 Coronel Bolognesi (1906) - retired 1958
Armored cruiser
 Comandante Aguirre (ex-French Dupuy de Lôme) (1890) - purchased 1912, purchase canceled 1914 
Light cruisers
   (1941, ex-British ) - assigned 1959, retired 1979. Called Almirante Grau 1960-1973
  (1942, ex-British ) - assigned 1960, retired 1982
   (1944, ex-Dutch ) - assigned 1973, retired 2017
  (1950, ex-Dutch ) - assigned 1978, retired 1999

United States

Uruguay
Protected cruiser
 Montevideo (1885, ex-Italian Dogali) - purchased 1908, decommissioned 1932

Venezuela
Protected cruiser
 Mariscal Sucre (ex-Spanish Isla de Cuba) (1886) - purchased 1912, decommissioned 1940

Asia

China

 Unprotected Cruisers
 Chaoyong class  (1880) - Sunk 1894
  (1881) - Sunk 1894
 Kai Che (1882) - Explosion 1902
 Nan Thin class  (1883)
 Nan Shuin (1884)
 Pao Min (1885)
 King Ch'ing class King Ch'ing (1886)
 Huan T'ai (1886) - Collision 1902
 Tung Chi (1894) - Sunk 1937
 Fu An (1897)

 Protected Cruisers
  (1883) - Captured by Japan 1895, renamed Sai Yen, mined 1904
 Chih Yuan class
  (1886) - Sunk 1894
  (1886) - Sunk 1895
 Hai Chi class cruiser, 4,300 ton, Armstrong
  (1897) - Sunk 1904
  (1898)  - Sunk 1937 as blockship in Yangtze river
 Hai Yung class  (1897) - Sunk 1937 as blockship in Yangtze river
 Hai Chou (1897) - Sunk 1937 as blockship in Yangtze river
  (1898) "Pearl of the Sea" - Sunk 1937 as blockship in Yangtze river 
   (1912) - Sunk 1937.
  (1913) - Sunk 1937.

 Armoured Cruisers
 King Yuan class  (1887) - Sunk 1894
  (1887) - Sunk 1895
 Lung Wei (1888) - Renamed Ping Yuen

 Light cruisers
   (1931) - Sunk 1937.
  (1931) - Sunk 1937. Re-floated by Japan and renamed Yasoshima. Sunk by US aircraft attack.
 British Arethusa class Chung King (1948) - ex- of the Royal Navy, sold on 19 May 1948 to the Nationalist Chinese Navy. Defected to Chinese Communists and then sunk by Nationalist aircraft in 1949, continued in service as an accommodations and warehouse hulk until mid-1950s.

India
 British   (1932, ex-British , purchased 1948) – Scrapped 1978  
 British   (1939, ex-British , purchased 1957) – Scrapped 1985

Indonesia
  (purchased 1962), former Soviet  Ordzhonikidze – Scrapped 1972

Japan

Pakistan
  (purchased 1956), the former British  , renamed Jahangir, c. 1961

Thailand/Siam
 Taksin class (1939, requisitioned by Italy 1941)
 Taksin (unfinished)
 Naresuan (unfinished)

Turkey/Ottoman Empire
Battlecruisers
 Yavuz Sultan Selim (ex-German Goeben) (1912) -purchased 1914, BU 1974
Unprotected cruisers
  (1892) - BU 1911
  (1892) - BU 1911
   (unfinished)
  (unfinished)
   (unfinished)
  (unfinished)
Protected cruisers
  (Abdul Hamid) (1903) - BU 1947
  (1903) - captured by Russian 1915, restored 1918, BU 1948
Light cruisers
 Midilli (ex-German Breslau ) (1912) - purchased 1914, mined 1918
Torpedo cruisers
 
  (1906)
  (1906)

Europe

Austria-Hungary

Belgium
 Protected cruiser
 D'Entrecasteaux

Croatia

 Light cruiser
 Zniam (ex-KB Dalmacija, ex-SMS Niobe)

Denmark
 Unprotected cruiser
 Fyen (1882)
 Protected cruisers
 Valkyrien (1888)
 Hekla (1890)
 Gejser class
 Gejser (1892)
 Heimdal (1894)

France

Germany
 List of battlecruisers of Germany
 List of cruisers of Germany

Greece

 Amalia (1861) - Renamed Hellas 1862, BU 1906
  (1879) - Sold 1931
 Antinavarchos Kountouriotis (1914) - Purchased by Royal Navy while under construction 
 Lambros Katsonis (1914) - Purchased by Royal Navy while under construction 
  (1912, purchased 1914) - Torpedoed by Italian submarine 1940
  (1910) - Italian Pisa class, preserved at Faliro as museum
  II (1935, ex-Italian Eugenio di Savoia, obtained in 1951 as war reparations) - Stricken 1964

Italy

Netherlands

Norway
Protected cruisers
 Viking (1891)
 Frithjof (1896)

Poland
Light cruisers
 Danae-class
 
 

Protected cruisers
 ORP Bałtyk

Portugal
  (1896) - Sold 1933
 São Gabriel class
  (1898) - Disposed of 1924
  (1898) - Wrecked 1923
 Dom Carlos I (1898) - Renamed Candido Reis 1910, disposed of 1923
 Rainha Dona Amélia (1899) - Renamed República 1910, wrecked 1915

Romania

Russia/USSR

Spain

Sweden
Armoured cruiser
  (1905) - Sold for BU 1957
Seaplane cruiser
  (1933) - converted to an anti-aircraft cruiser - BU 1963
Light cruisers
  converted to anti-aircraft cruisers
  (1944)
  (1945)
Mine cruiser
  (1943)
 
Torpedo cruisers

Ukraine
Light cruisers
 Krasnyi Krym
 Pamiat' Merkuria
Guided-missile cruisers
 Ukraina

United Kingdom
 List of battlecruisers of the Royal Navy
 List of cruisers of the Royal Navy

Yugoslavia
  (the former German )

Oceania

Australia
Protected cruiser
  (1902) - Scuttled 1932
Battlecruiser
  (1911) - Scuttled 1924
Light cruisers
 British Chatham class
  (1912) - BU 1929
  (1912) - BU 1929
  (1915) - Sold for BU 1936
  (1918) - BU 1949
 British Leander (Apollo) class
  (1934) - Sunk 1942
  (1934) - Sunk 1941
  (1934) - BU 1962
Heavy cruisers
 British 
  (1927) - BU 1955
  (1927) - Sunk 1942
  (1927) - BU 1955

New Zealand
 HMNZS Achilles - Formerly British Achilles
 HMNZS Leander - Formerly British Leander
 HMNZS Gambia - Formerly British Gambia
 HMNZS Black Prince - Formerly British Black Prince
 HMNZS Bellona - Formerly British Bellona
 HMNZS Royalist - Formerly British Royalist

See also 
 List of ironclads
 List of battleships
 List of ships of the Second World War
 List of cruisers of the Second World War

References